The Ack Ack Stakes is a Grade III American Thoroughbred horse race for three years old and older, over a distance of one mile on the dirt held annually in September at Churchill Downs, in Louisville, Kentucky.  The event currently carries a purse of $300,000.

History
The race is named for the great Ack Ack, inducted into the National Museum of Racing and Hall of Fame in 1986 and the Horse of the Year in 1971, as well as ranking number 44 in the Blood-Horse magazine List of the Top 100 U.S. Racehorses of the 20th Century.
At age 3, he won the 1969 Derby Trial in his lone start at Churchill Downs with a time of 1:34.40, which was a track record at the time.
 
Since inception in 1991, the Ack Ack has been contested at three different distances:
 1 mile : 1991, 2006–2009, 2012
  furlongs : 1994–2005
  miles : 2010, 2011 (Breeders' Cup)

The inaugural running of the event was on 27 October 1991 with Seven Spades the longest price runner in the field of 12 at 40-1 holding on to win by a neck in a time of 1:37.62 for the mile on the sloppy track.

The event was not held in 1992 and 1993.

Previously a Listed race, it was upgraded to Grade III status for 1997 by the American Graded Stakes Committee.

Sin 2013 the event has been scheduled in September and in 2016 the conditions of the event were changed from handicap to stakes allowance.

Records
Speed record
 1 mile: 1:33.78 – Pants On Fire (2013)  
 furlongs: 1:27.15 – Cappuchino (2003)  
 miles: 1:43.79 - Apart (2010)

Margins
 lengths – Istan (2007)

Most wins
 No horse has won this race more than once.
Most wins by a jockey
 4 – Calvin Borel (1996, 1998, 1999, 2004)

Most wins by a trainer
 2 –  Bobby C. Barnett  (1996, 1999)
 2 – William I. Mott (2001, 2007)
 2 –  Paul J. McGee  (2002, 2009)
 2 – Steven M. Asmussen (2008, 2015)
 2 – Dallas Stewart (2016, 2018)

Most wins by an owner
 2 – John A. Franks (1996, 1999)

Winners

See also
 List of American and Canadian Graded races

References

Graded stakes races in the United States
Grade 3 stakes races in the United States
Open mile category horse races
Recurring sporting events established in 1991
Churchill Downs horse races
1991 establishments in Kentucky